Dunnet Head is a peninsula in Caithness, on the north coast of  Scotland. Dunnet Head includes the most northerly point of both mainland Scotland and the island of Great Britain.

Geography

Dunnet Head can be seen also as the western limit of the Pentland Firth on the firth's southern, or Caithness, side (Duncansby Head is the eastern limit). Although Easter Head is the most northerly point on the Scottish mainland, the northernmost point of Scotland lies in the Shetland islands, approximately  further north.

The headland's boundary with the rest of the Scottish mainland can be defined as a north–south line running from Little Clett to the mouth of Dunnet Burn in Dunnet Bay. This line is followed along most of its route by a single track road, the B855, which links Brough with the village of Dunnet, making this the most northerly road on mainland Britain. From this line, the headland projects westward and northward into the Atlantic Ocean and the Pentland Firth and shelters the more southerly waters of Dunnet Bay.

The peninsula is north-east of the burgh of Thurso, and on a clear day, it affords views of the islands of Stroma to the east, and Hoy and the Orkney Mainland, 15 km (9 miles) away to the north, across the Pentland Firth.

Military use
Near the Dunnet Head lighthouse are minor fortifications built during World War II to protect the naval base at Scapa Flow, including a Chain Home Low radar station and a bunker used by the Royal Observer Corps during the Cold War. Burifa Hill on Dunnet Head was the site of the master station and a monitoring station of the northern GEE chain of radio navigation stations during World War II. There was also an artillery range on Dunnet Head during World War II.

Angling 
Dunnet Head lochs are restocked every two years with brown trout fry; fishing by permit is between 1 April and early October.

Bird watching 
Dunnet Head has a viewing platform where visitors can watch birds in the neighbouring cliffs. Depending on the season, birds may include fulmars, guillemots, kittiwakes, puffins, great skuas, arctic skuas, razorbills, and - at sea - gannets and herring gulls.

Geodesy 

See also
 Mull of Galloway - Scotland's most southerly point
 Corrachadh Mòr - Scotland's most westerly point on the mainland
 Keith Inch - Scotland's most easterly point on the mainland
 Lizard Point - most southerly point on the island of Great Britain
 List of lighthouses in Scotland
 List of Northern Lighthouse Board lighthouses
 Ness Point - most easterly point on the island of Great Britain

References

External links

 Dunnet Head Educational Trust 

Headlands of Scotland
Peninsulas of Scotland
Sites of Special Scientific Interest in Caithness
Royal Society for the Protection of Birds reserves in Scotland
Landforms of Highland (council area)